Gunung Rapat (Jawi: ڬونوڠ راڤت) is a suburb of Ipoh, Perak, Malaysia.

References

External links 
 Gunung Rapat is one of the prime areas of Ipoh today.

Populated places in Perak